Banktivity (formerly known as iBank) is a personal finance management suite designed for macOS and iOS platforms by IGG Software and debuted in 2003 as a Mac desktop software.

History 
There have been a total of 8 releases for the desktop version since its inception. Over this same period, IGG Software Inc. also released iOS versions for the iPhone (2009), the iPad (2012), and Apple Watch. Features differ between the apps, specifically the lack of reporting on the iPhone version.

Macworld compared iBank 2 to Quicken, but "with a decidedly Mac-like interface". iBank 3 was updated for Mac OS X Leopard, with support for Cover Flow, Quick Look, and Core Animation. It also integrates with other Apple Inc. products, such as syncing with an iPhone via MobileMe. iBank 3.4 improved support for Quicken import.

iBank 4 was updated to be compatible with Mac OS X 10.7. Some iBank 4 features included Direct Connect (downloads from online accounts), iPhone sync, MobileMe compatibility, interactive charts, multiple currencies, a budget monitor, check printing, loan and portfolio management, smart accounts, TurboTax exporting, and Quicken importing.

iBank 5 was released November 19, 2013, introducing several new features such as online billpay, Direct Access and Improvements to budgeting. iBank 5 saw the release of six major upgrades to the product through iBank 5.6.4 which included the addition of iBank Cloud Sync. Banktivity 5 was released on January 28, 2016. After nearly 13 years, IGG retired the iBank name, announcing Banktivity as the successor of the IGG's personal finance software line.

Banktivity 6: initial public release on April 25, 2017.

Banktivity 7: initial public release on September 24, 2018.

Banktivity's features include a proprietary cloud sync that can be used between macOS and iOS devices, traditional and envelope budgets, multi-currency support and investment portfolio management.

Reception 
According to MacWorld, MacLife Magazine, Endgadet and others, Banktivity is considered in the Mac user community as viable alternative to Quicken for Mac.

iBank was the runner-up for the Best Mac OS X Leopard Application in the 2007 Apple Design Awards.

References 

Business software
MacOS-only software
Accounting software
Financial software
Personal information manager software for macOS